River Fleet or River fleet may refer to

 River Fleet, a subterranean river of London
 River Fleet (Sutherlandshire), in northern Scotland, which begins in Lairg, runs through Strath Fleet, flowing into Loch Fleet 
 Water of Fleet, in southern Scotland
 patrol boats, or ships or boats which patrol a river; cf. navy